Milarepa is a 1974 Italian drama film directed by Liliana Cavani. It was entered into the 1974 Cannes Film Festival. The film tells the story of the famous Tibetan yogi and poet Milarepa.

Cast
 Lajos Balázsovits as Leo Milarepa
 Paolo Bonacelli as Prof. Bennet
 Marisa Fabbri as Milarepa's mother
 Marcella Michelangeli as Karin
 George Wang

References

External links

Filmografia di Liliana Cavani Detailed information on this film.

1974 films
1974 drama films
Italian drama films
1970s Italian-language films
Vietnamese-language films
Films directed by Liliana Cavani
1970s Italian films